HMS Audacious was a 74-gun third-rate ship of the line of the Royal Navy, launched on 23 July 1785 at Rotherhithe. She was the first ship to bear the name.

She was among the group of ships that dismasted the French three-decker Révolutionnaire before the Glorious First of June. She also took part in the Battle of the Nile, under Captain Davidge Gould, where she engaged the French ship  and helped to force her surrender.

She was finally broken up in August 1815.

Notes

References

 
 Lavery, Brian (2003) The Ship of the Line - Volume 1: The development of the battlefleet 1650-1850. Conway Maritime Press. .

External links
 

 

Ships of the line of the Royal Navy
Arrogant-class ships of the line
1785 ships